Kesrisinghpur is a town and a municipality in Ganganagar district in the Indian state of Rajasthan.

Demographics
As of 2011 India census, Kesrisinghpur had a population of 14,020. Males constitute 52.76% of the population and females 47.24%. Kesrisinghpur has an average literacy rate of 62%, higher than the national average of 59.5%: male literacy is 69%, and female literacy is 53%. In Kesrisinghpur, 16% of the population is under 6 years of age.

It is situated near the Punjab (state) border. It is located in the Cotton Belt area of India and the livelihood of most of the people residing in KesriSinghPur (KSP) is commission brokerage of grains and cotton and quite a lot of people are involved in agriculture.

Transport and infrastructure

The infrastructure of town is now much developing. Cemented roads are every where in kesrisinghpur.

By Train - there is direct train from Delhi Sarai Rohilla railway station [DEE] to Kesrisinghpur. Train no 12455/56 Delhi Sarai Rohila [DEE] to Bikaner [BKN] superfast express and from Sri Ganganagar few passenger trains to Suratgarh goes via Kesrisinghpur.

Economy 
Following the construction of the Ganges Canal, the main occupation of near by villages is agriculture, which is also the basis of the city's economy. The main crops are wheat, mustard and cotton while other crops includes guar, bajra, sugar cane and grams. In recent years, kinnow (a hybrid citrus fruit derived from the orange and lemon) has also gained prominence with farmers. The industries in the city are mostly based on agriculture. The people of the town are involved in their family businesses.
People have their own cows and rely heavily on their own organic vegetables (produce) from private farms.

Notes

Cities and towns in Sri Ganganagar district